Figure skating at the 1984 Winter Olympics took place at the Zetra Olympic Hall in Sarajevo, Yugoslavia. Jayne Torvill and Christopher Dean won gold for Great Britain, receiving twelve perfect scores (6.0), (a maximum 9 of them for artistic impression, the others in the technical merit mark) in the free dance segment of the ice dance competition, a feat that was never matched. They received the most maximum 6.0 marks of any figure skaters at the Olympics.

Medal table

Participating NOCs
Twenty-one nations sent figure skaters to compete in the events at Sarajevo.

Results

Men

Referee:
  Donald H. Gilchrist

Assistant Referee:
  Tjasa Andrée

Judges:
  Vladimir Amsel
  Gerhard Frey
  Monique Georgelin
  Ida Tateoka
  Ingrid Linke
  Björn Elwin
  Tatiana Danilenko
  Oskar Urban
  Margaret Berezowski
  Tsukasa Kimura (substitute)

Ladies

Referee:
  Sonia Bianchetti

Assistant Referee:
  Radovan Lipovscak

Judges:
  Mikhail Drei
  Ante Skrtic
  Heinz Müllenbach
  Giorgio Siniscalco
  Jacqueline Itschner
  Walburga Grimm
  Raymond C. Alperth
  Norris Bowden
  Claude Carlens
  Toshio Suzuki (substitute)

Pairs

Referee:
  Elemér Terták

Assistant Referee:
  Benjamin T. Wright

Judges:
  Pamela Davis
  Alain Calmat
  Dagmar Řeháková
  Franklin S. Nelson
  Walburga Grimm
  David Dore
  Mikhail Drei
  Ute Druvins
  Toshio Suzuki
  Claude Carlens (substitute)

Ice dance

Referee:
  Lawrence Demmy

Assistant Referee:
  Hans Kutschera

Judges:
  István Sugár
  Irina Absaliamova
  Heinz Müllenbach
  Courtney J.L. Jones
  Tsukasa Kimura
  Dagmar Řeháková
  Cia Bordogna
  Ann Shaw
  Elaine DeMore
  Lysiane Lauret (substitute)

On the 30 year anniversary of the Sarajevo Winter Olympics, the pair of Jayne Torvill / Christopher Dean returned to Sarajevo on 13 February to perform Bolero.

References

External links
 Official Olympic Report
 results
 http://library.la84.org/OlympicInformationCenter/OlympicReview/1984/ore197/ORE197f.pdf

 
1984 Winter Olympics events
1984
1984 in figure skating
International figure skating competitions hosted by Yugoslavia